Andrea Romero is an American politician and entrepreneur serving as a member of the New Mexico House of Representatives from the 46th district, which includes part of Santa Fe County.

Early life and education 
Romero was born and raised in Santa Fe, New Mexico. Romero earned a Bachelor of Arts degree in Political Science from Stanford University.

Career 
After graduating from college, Romero returned to New Mexico and established Tall Foods, a food startup that produces probiotics through ostrich eggs. While she was a candidate for the 2018 election, Romero stepped down as Director of the Regional Coalition of LANL Communities after she was criticized for travel expense reimbursements for leisure items such as baseball tickets and alcoholic beverage purchases. Then-State Auditor, Wayne Johnson, released the results of an audit on the company which revealed that Romero had not acted improperly. Romero faced partisan calls to suspend her campaign, though she was defended by House Speaker Brian Egolf. Romero defeated incumbent Democrat Carl Trujillo and took office on January 15, 2019.

References 

Democratic Party members of the New Mexico House of Representatives
Stanford University alumni
People from Santa Fe, New Mexico
Politicians from Santa Fe, New Mexico
Year of birth missing (living people)
Living people